TeleChoice is an Australian telecommunications company, founded in 1995.

References

External links
 

Telecommunications companies of Australia
Telecommunications companies established in 1995
Australian companies established in 1995